The 1978 Little All-America college football team is composed of college football players from small colleges and universities who were selected by the Associated Press (AP) as the best players at each position.

First team

Offense
 Tight end - Dan Rossra, Northeastern
 Wide receivers - Randy Jordan, Weber State; James Warring, Eastern Illinois
 Offensive tackles - Jon Borchardt, Montana State; Billy John, Texas A&I
 Offensive guards - Bruce Kimball, Massachusetts; Tyrone McGriff, Florida A&M
 Center - Frank Bouressa, Lawrence
 Quarterback - Jeff Komlo, Delaware
 Running backs - Jerry Aldridge, Angelo State; Frank Hawkins, Nevada-Reno

Defense
 Defensive ends - Jim Haslett, Indiana (PA); John Morning, C.W. Post
 Defensive tackles - Jesse Baker, Jacksonville State; Robert Hardy, Jackson State
 Middle guard - James Curry, Nevada-Reno
 Linebackers - Jerry Lumpkin, Northern Arizona; Tim Tucker, Troy State; John Zamberlin, Pacific Lutheran
 Defensive backs - Mike Betts, Austin Peay; Dennis Duncanson, Weber State; Bill Moats, South Dakota

See also
 1978 College Football All-America Team

References

Little All-America college football team
Little All-America college football team
Little All-America college football team
Little All-America college football teams